Qala Qureh castle is a historical castle located in Bijar County in Kurdistan Province.

References 

Castles in Iran